Myxodagnus sagitta is a species of sand stargazer endemic to the Galapagos Islands where it can be found in areas with sandy bottoms at depths of from .  This species can reach a maximum length of  SL.

References

sagitta
Fish described in 1946
Endemic fauna of the Galápagos Islands